Gomk is a village in the Vayk Municipality of the Vayots Dzor Province of Armenia.

History 
In the village is a 17th-century church and an important shrine/khachkar from 1263. The inscription upon it reads:

Gallery

References

External links 

 
 
 

Populated places in Vayots Dzor Province